Mr. Magorium's Wonder Emporium is a 2007 children's fantasy comedy film  written and directed by Zach Helm, produced by FilmColony, Mandate Pictures, Walden Media, Richard N. Gladstein and James Garavente, and with music composed by Alexandre Desplat and Aaron Zigman.

The film stars Dustin Hoffman as the owner of a magical toy store and Natalie Portman as his store employee. A cameo by Kermit the Frog was the character's first major theatrical appearance since 1999's Muppets from Space.

Theatrically released on 16 November 2007 by 20th Century Fox, it received mixed reviews and grossed $69.5 million worldwide. Helm subsequently disowned the film in later years. The film was released on DVD and Blu-ray on 4 March 2008 by 20th Century Fox Home Entertainment.

Plot 
Molly Mahoney, a former musical  prodigy suffering from artist's block is an amateur pianist and an employee at "Mr. Magorium's Wonder Emporium", a magical toy shop run by 243-year-old Mr. Edward Magorium. Besides Molly and Mr. Magorium, store bookbuilder Bellini, a strongman, is also employed. Eric Applebaum is a boy who comes to the store daily and functions as an employee despite his age.

Mr. Magorium gives Molly the Congreve Cube, a block of wood, and tells her it will guide her to a new life if she has faith in it. Molly wants to become a concert pianist and composer but has not been able to complete her first concerto.

Mr. Magorium announces that he intends to "leave" and is giving the shop to Molly.  In preparation for his departure, Mr. Magorium hires an accountant, Henry Weston to organize the shop's paperwork and determine his legacy to Molly. Henry does not believe that the toy store is magical.

When Molly becomes upset about her inability to properly run the store, the Emporium 'throws a tantrum', assaulting everyone inside with the toys until Mr. Magorium calms it down. Molly realizes that Mr. Magorium is going to die, so she rushes him to a hospital until he is discharged the next day. She then attempts to prevent Mr. Magorium's departure by showing him the joys of life. Back at the store, Mr. Magorium uses the stage notes of Shakespeare's King Lear to make a point about the natural simplicity of death before dying himself.  Believing herself to be incapable of owning a magical store, Molly puts the Emporium up for sale, and the store loses all its magic.

Henry meets Molly to draw up the sale papers, where he sees the Congreve Cube and asks her about it. When Molly confesses her complete faith in the store, the block flies around the store. After witnessing this, Henry faints with shock. When he awakes and questions Molly, she tells him that it was a dream. He then learns Molly made the cube fly and he believes in her, realizing Molly can be anything if she believes in herself. The store returns to its former glory as Molly's confidence increases.

Cast 
 Dustin Hoffman as Mr. Edward Magorium, the toy store's eccentric 243-year-old owner
 Natalie Portman as Molly Mahoney, the store manager, and former child piano prodigy, who feels "stuck" in life
 Jason Bateman as Henry Weston (aka "Mutant"), the straight-laced, rigid accountant hired to get Mr. Magorium's paperwork in order
 Zach Mills as Eric Applebaum, a lonely 9-year-old who comes to the store regularly and has trouble making friends
 Ted Ludzik as Bellini, the bookbinder who was born in the shop's basement and writes Mr. Magorium's biography
 Kiele Sanchez as Mrs. Goodman, a customer
 Jonathan Potts as a hospital doctor
 Steve Whitmire as Kermit the Frog in a cameo appearance

Production 
Photography was from 31 March 2006 to 6 June 2006 in Toronto, Ontario, Canada.  The film was produced by FilmColony's Richard N. Gladstein and Gang of Two's James Garavente, and financed by Walden Media, and Mandate Pictures's Joe Drake and Nathan Kahane.

Novelization 

Written by Suzanne Weyn, the novelization was published in 2007, by Scholastic Inc.

Release 
The premiere of Mr Magorium's Wonder Emporium, attended by Natalie Portman and Dustin Hoffman, also doubled as a fundraising event with tickets having been made available to the public. Funds raised at the event were donated to the Barnardo's children's charity and other charities based in the United Kingdom.

To promote the film the Los Angeles Times ran a scratch and sniff advertisement with a frosted cake smell.

Box office 
The film was released in the United States and Canada on 16 November 2007 and grossed $9.6 million in 3,164 theaters its opening weekend, ranking #5 at the box office. It went on to gross $32.1 million in the U.S. and a further $35.4 million in the rest of the world which gives the film a box office total of $67.5 million.

Critical response 

On the review aggregator Rotten Tomatoes, 39% of critics gave the film positive reviews based on 126 reviews, with an average rating of 5.20/10. The consensus reads, "Mr. Magorium's Wonder Emporiums title is much more fun than the film itself, as colorful visuals and talented players can't make up for a bland story." On Metacritic, the film had an average score of 48 out of 100, based on 26 reviews. Audiences polled by CinemaScore gave the film an average grade of "B+" on an A+ to F scale. Peter Travers of Rolling Stone declared the film the year's Worst Family Film on his list of the Worst Movies of 2007.

Roger Ebert of the Chicago Sun-Times gave the film 3 out of 4 and wrote: "This isn't quite the over-the-top fantasy you'd like it to be, but it's a charming enough little movie, and probably the younger you are, the more charming." 
In recognition of the fact that it was "aimed directly at very young children", William Arnold of the Seattle Post-Intelligencer observed its "unforced and exceedingly gentle humor, its imaginative but never-quite-excessive production design and its ingratiating and surprisingly detailed performancesespecially by Portman and Batemangradually break down one's cynical defenses".

Writer-director Zach Helm later disowned the film, calling it "a trainwreck", after the film was referenced in an episode of the AMC drama Breaking Bad.

Awards 

For his performance in the film, Zach Mills was nominated for a Young Artist Award for Best Performance in a Feature Film – Leading Young Actor.

The film has won two awards: the Heartland Film Festival Truly Moving Pictures award; and the Dove Foundation Seal of Approval, whose presenters felt it was "a delightful family film". Shawn Edwards of Fox called it "the most magical film of the year".

Home media 
The film was released on DVD and Blu-ray Disc on 4 March 2008 by 20th Century Fox Home Entertainment in the US.
It was also released on DVD and Blu-Ray Disc by Icon Home Entertainment in the UK.

Music 

The score was composed by Alexandre Desplat and Aaron Zigman, and was released on 13 November 2007. The album also included the song "Love the World You Find" performed by the Flaming Lips.

In popular culture 
In the penultimate episode of the hit AMC series Breaking Bad (season 5, episode 15, "Granite State"), Walter White's off-grid New Hampshire residence contains only two DVDs, both of which are Mr. Magorium's Wonder Emporium.

In season 1, episode 7 of the HBO Max series Close Enough, a flashback scene of Josh and Emily's first date shows Josh explaining to Emily why he feels the Academy Award for Best Picture might go to Mr. Magorium's Wonder Emporium.

References

External links 

 
 
 

2007 films
2007 directorial debut films
2007 comedy films
2000s children's comedy films
2000s children's fantasy films
2000s fantasy comedy films
American children's comedy films
Children's fantasy films
LGBT-related controversies in film
Films about toys
Puppet films
20th Century Fox films
Mandate Pictures films
Walden Media films
Films scored by Alexandre Desplat
Films scored by Aaron Zigman
Films shot in Toronto
2000s English-language films
2000s American films